Eubranchus cucullus is a species of sea slug or nudibranch, a marine gastropod mollusc in the family Eubranchidae.

Distribution
This species was described from Puerto Refugio, Isla Angel de la Guarda, Baja California, Mexico. It has also been reported from Panama.

References

Eubranchidae
Gastropods described in 1985